Damerjog or Damerdjog is a small village located in eastern Djibouti, populated by farmers and gardeners, located in the Arta Region,  southeast of the capital Djibouti, north of the border with Somaliland.

History

Between Djibouti City and Loyada are a number of anthropomorphic and phallic stelae. The structures are associated with graves of rectangular shape flanked by vertical slabs. The Djibouti-Loyada stelae are of uncertain age, and some of them are adorned with a T-shaped symbol. During the Middle Ages, the Djibouti area including Damerjog was part of the Adal and Ifat Sultanates. The Ottoman Empire had control over the area from the sixteenth to the nineteenth century. It later was part of the French Somaliland protectorate in the first half of the 20th century. The village was surrounded by a military post for the participation in migration control and against raids from the Front de Libération de la Côte des Somalis in the 1970s. An Acheulean site (from 800,000 to 400,000 years BC), where stone was cut, was excavated in the 1990s, in Gombourta, between Damerdjog and Loyada.

Demographics
As of 2019, the population of Damerjog has been estimated to be 1,321. The town inhabitants belong to various mainly Afro-Asiatic-speaking ethnic groups, with the Issa Somali predominant.

Overview
Nearby towns and villages include Loyada (9 km), Ali Oune (14 km), Djibouti City (16 km), and Arta (51 km).

Climate

References

Arta Region
Populated places in Djibouti